Ejaji is a town in the woreda of Cheliya, Ethiopia.

Transport 
It proposed to be a junction on the western line of the proposed Ethiopian railway.

Ejaji is a town in central Ethiopia. Located in the West Shewa Zone of the Oromia Region, on the all-weather highway between Addis Ababa and Nekemte, this town has a longitude and latitude of 8.9970° N, 37.3266°E. Ejaji is the administrative center of Elu Gelan woreda.

See also 
 Railway stations in Ethiopia
 List of cities and towns in Ethiopia

Populated places in the Oromia Region